Boracic lint is a type of medical dressing made from surgical lint that is soaked in a hot, saturated solution of boracic acid and glycerine and then left to dry.

It has been in use since at least the 19th century, but is now less commonly used. When in use, boracic lint proved to be very valuable in the treatment of leg ulcers.

The term "boracic" is also used as Cockney rhyming slang for having no money: "boracic lint" → "skint".

References

First aid